The Kathrin Cawein Gallery of Art, named in honor of the artist, Kathrin Cawein, is an Oregon artistic institution affiliated with Pacific University in Forest Grove, Oregon.

External links
Official site
Washington County Visitors Association

Art museums and galleries in Oregon
Pacific University
Tourist attractions in Washington County, Oregon
University museums in Oregon